Lee Clayton (born 1942) is an American country-western musician.

Lee Clayton may also refer to:
 John Lee Clayton Jr. (born 1952), American jazz musician
 Lee Clayton (journalist) (born 1970), UK sports journalist
 Cecil Lee Clayton (died 2015), person executed in Missouri
 Lee Clayton, a character in Fugitive of the Judoon
 Robert E. Lee Clayton, a character in The Missouri Breaks

See also